Rock Rivals was a British television drama series following the lives of two celebrity judges on an X Factor style show as their marriage falls apart. It was produced by Shed Productions, the company behind Footballers' Wives, Bad Girls and Waterloo Road. The series began on 5 March 2008 on ITV and finished on 23 April 2008. It was not renewed, due to both poor ratings and reviews.

Production
The eight-part series was filmed from summer to autumn 2007, and delivered to ITV in spring 2008.

On 2 July 2007 it was announced that former EastEnders actress Michelle Collins and former Coronation Street actor Sean Gallagher had both been cast for the lead roles of characters Karina Faith (née Lewis) (Collins) and her husband Mal (Gallagher). Two days later, in an appearance on the chat show Loose Women, Collins said that it would be filmed over a four-month schedule, and would probably air in January or February 2008.

Rock Rivals finally wrapped on Stage B of Ardmore Studios in Bray, Ireland, on Friday 16 November. Two alternative endings were filmed for the final episode. The viewing public were to be given the chance to vote for their favourite finalist, and the appropriate version was to be aired.<ref>"[http://www.itv.com/Drama/contemporary/RockRivals/RockRivalsVote/default.html Viewers choose who wins 'Rock Rival]"</ref>

The show also starred Siva Kaneswaran, who would later become a member of The Wanted.

Cast

Plot

Series 1 (2008)Rock Rivals follows the lives of two celebrity judges on an X Factor'' style show as their marriage falls apart. Talent contest judge Simon Cowell, a veteran of such shows, joined forces with Shed Media to produce the series.

Episodes

DVD release
The 3-disc DVD box set of Rock Rivals was released in the UK on 28 April 2009, distributed by Universal.

References

External links

Rock Rivals at Shed-Media.com

2008 British television series debuts
2008 British television series endings
2000s British drama television series
ITV television dramas
2000s British television miniseries
Television series by Warner Bros. Television Studios
English-language television shows
2000s British music television series